Andreas Fasching (born 1 January 1981) is an Austrian former professional tennis player.

Fasching, who comes from Styria, left school at the age of 16 to compete professionally and trained under Günter Bresnik. He reached a career high world ranking of 423 and made his only ATP Tour main draw appearance in 2006 at the Austrian Open, losing in the first round to Ivan Ljubičić.

Retiring in 2006, Fasching became a tennis coach and in 2013 began working for the ÖTV.

ITF Futures titles

Singles: (1)

References

External links
 
 

1981 births
Living people
Austrian male tennis players
Sportspeople from Styria